Away Message is the third extended play by American singer and songwriter Ari Lennox. It was released on August 31, 2022, by Dreamville and Interscope Records. The EP includes production from Elite, Dallas Austin, OG Parker, Deputy, DZL, and Ron Gilmore, among others.

Background
On August 31, she released the third single "Queen Space" featuring Summer Walker. Later that day, she released a surprise 5-track EP called Away Message, including songs that were recorded for the album but did not make the final cut.

Critical reception
Craig Jenkins of Vulture said "Lennox set the tone for the new album with Away Message, a short EP released in late August. The jazzy deep cut "No Settling" makes the most of a dire situation — 'I have options, but they garbage, so I'd rather be free'—in the same way the album takes stock of the men in the singer's orbit and frequently opts out of any further engagement." SoulBounce wrote about the EP breaking down the songs saying "Queen Space" "sets the bar high for the rest of the EP. Ari and Summer have already shown their chemistry on "Unloyal". "Tatted" and "Gummy" "sound straight outta the '90s R&B archives yet fresh and new. [...] On "No Settling" as she realizes that she needs more than she’s being offered. She even goes so far to spell it out to anyone who doesn't understand her plight. That discontent carries over into "Bitter."

Track listing

References

2022 EPs
Albums produced by Dallas Austin
Dreamville Records albums